R v Mabula is an important case in South African law. It was heard in the Appellate Division in Bloemfontein in October 1926. The judges were Innes CJ, De Villiers JA, Kotz JA, Wessels JA and Gardiner AJA.

Facts 
The case turned on whether a thatch-roofed structure, used as a dwelling for the accommodation of six or seven persons, and whose walls were built of sods resting directly upon the ground, there being no foundations or other attachment, constituted immovable property.

Judgment 
The court held that the structure was indeed immovable property, and so warranted a charge and conviction for arson.

See also 
 Arson
 Crime in South Africa
 Law of South Africa
 South African criminal law
 South African property law

References

Case law 
 R v Mabula 1927 AD 159.

Notes 

1926 in South African law
1926 in case law
Appellate Division (South Africa) cases
Arson in Africa